This is a list of rivers in Mali. This list is arranged  by drainage basin, with respective tributaries indented under each larger stream's name.

Atlantic Ocean

[[senegal River
Falémé River
Karakoro River
Kolinbiné River
Sanaba River
Bafing River
Bakoy River
Baoulé River
Badinko River
Kokoro River

Gulf of Guinea

Volta River (Ghana)
Black Volta (Burkina Faso)
Sourou River
Niger River
Dallol Bosso (Niger)
Vallée de l'Azaouak
Vallée de l'Ahzar
Vallée du Tilemsi
Diaka River
Bani River
Koni River
Banifing River
Bagoé River
Nifing River
Banifing River
Kankélaba River
Bafini River
Baoulé River
Banifing River
Banifing River (Bafing River)
Dégou River
Canal du Sahel
Faya River
Sankarani River
Ouassoulou River (Bale River)
Fié River

References

Rand McNally, The New International Atlas, 1993.
 GEOnet Names Server

Mali
Rivers